Ex Models is an American no wave-influenced post-hardcore band based in Brooklyn, New York.

Career
The band, based around brothers Shahin and Shahryar Motia, was started while they were in high school. They reunited after college to make their first album, Other Mathematics, released in 2001 on Ace Fu Records. The subject of their lyrics ranges from sex to Jean Baudrillard and his philosophy about simulacra.

Their second album, Zoo Psychology, was released two years later. By this time, bass guitarist Mike Masiello left the band. Zach Lehrhoff replaced him, providing vocals as well.

By 2005, the band had been reduced to the duo of Shahin and Zach and a third album, Chrome Panthers, was released marking a new direction, even more repetitive and minimalist, which the band dubbed "Fundustrial Noise". Contributing on record, and occasionally live, was drummer Kid Millions of Oneida. 

In 2007, the 'classic' line-up of both Motias, Zach and drummer Jake Fiedler performed in NYC's East River Park. However, the reunion with Fiedler was short-lived, with the remaining three commencing to play out as Knyfe Hyts, a more metal-oriented outfit.

Other activities
Ex Models are active in the Brooklyn music scene and are also in side bands. Shahin has played with The First Lady Of Cuntry and the Cunts and Zach in The Seconds, Pterodactyl, and with Marnie Stern. In 2010, Shahin was a member of Oneida.

Members
Shahin Motia - vocals/guitar
Zach Lehrhoff - vocals/bass guitar or guitar
Shahryar Motia - guitar
Jake Fiedler - drums

Former
Mike Masiello - bass guitar
Kid Millions - drums (guest)

Discography
Albums
Other Mathematics (2001, Ace Fu Records)
Zoo Psychology (2003, Frenchkiss Records)
Chrome Panthers (2005, Troubleman Unlimited)

Splits, compilations, LPs
This Is Next Year: A Brooklyn-Based Compilation (2001, Arena Rock Recording Co.)
U.S. Pop Life Vol. 13 Northeast New Core (2001, Contact Records) (Japan Only)
Ex Models/The Seconds Pink EP (2002, My Pal God Records)
Raw Wild Love 7-inch (2002, X-Mist Records)
Sonik Mook Experiment Vol. 3: HOT SHIT (2003 Mute/Blast First)
Zoo Psychology LP (2003, X-Mist Records)
Ex Models/Holy Molar split 7-inch EP (2004, Three One G)
Chrome Panthers LP (European Edition) (2005, X-Mist)

References

External links

Troubleman Unlimited Records
Lazy-i Interview: October 2005
PUNKCAST#211 Vid of Ex Models @ Siberia NYC - Oct 18 2002. (RealPlayer)
PUNKCAST#1169 Vid of Ex Models @ East River Park NYC - Jun 23 2007. (RealPlayer, mp4)

American noise rock music groups
American post-hardcore musical groups
American art rock groups
Musical groups from New York (state)
My Pal God Records artists
Frenchkiss Records artists